Malaqaye was a Nubian queen with the title king's wife. Her husband was perhaps Tantamani, but this is only a guess. So far she is only known from her burial at Nuri (Nu. 59). 

Her burial at Nuri consists at one time most likely of a pyramid with a chapel and two underground burial chambers. When excavated, the pyramid and chapel were totally gone. There was a staircase going underground leading to two burial chambers that were found looted, but still contained substantial part of the original equipment, including a silver mummy mask, many mummy coverings in silver and many amulets. The name of the queen was preserved on a heart scarab. Fragments of more than 100 uninscribed shabtis were found too.

References 

7th-century BC Egyptian women

Queens consort of the Twenty-fifth Dynasty of Egypt
7th-century BC women
Queens of Kush